Falmouth Academy is a non-profit, coed, independent, private college-preparatory day school serving students from grades 7–12. It is located in Falmouth, Massachusetts on Cape Cod.

History
Falmouth Academy was founded in 1977 as a small and rigorously academic day school. Its first classes were held in the basement of a retirement home; two years later, it moved to another rental property on the Massachusetts Military Reservation in Bourne, Massachusetts.

In 1985, Josiah K. Lilly III gave Falmouth Academy  next to prime conservation land, nearer to the town center and between Falmouth centers for medicine and the arts. Four years later, the school moved into the new 16-classroom building in time for the opening of the 1989–1990 school year. 

Since then, the school's building has undergone four significant renovations. A gymnasium was added to accommodate its sports teams in 1997. Then, a three-story,  addition in 2006 that included science labs, art rooms, offices, a computer lab, and a library was named in honor of its longest-serving headmaster Bruce Buxton. In 2014-2015, a 3,600-square-foot meeting hall was added for school and community events and meetings. In July 2017 the school celebrated the grand opening of the Simon Center for the Arts, a 7,200 square foot space comprising a state-of-the-art theater, the Gordon T. Heald Music Room, a Green Room, Set Design Shop, Technical Control Room, and Gallery.

The current head of school at Falmouth Academy is Matthew A. Green, who was appointed in 2017.

Academics 
Falmouth Academy defines itself as a "reading and writing school", but its diverse curriculum also includes mathematics, science, and the arts. Its core curriculum requires each student to take English, history, science, mathematics, and a foreign language for at least five years out of six.  There is also a strong focus on the skills of writing, close reading, research, and effective management of time.  Cooperative learning and independent research are also central to the curriculum.  Students may take four to five elective courses each year, including physical education for middle schoolers and a science fair class for those below 10th grade, in addition to their core academic courses.

The average class size is thirteen students, and most of its graduates go to highly competitive colleges. Falmouth Academy is a member of the National Association of Independent Schools and the Association of Independent Schools in New England. It has been accredited by the New England Association of Schools and Colleges.

Athletics 
Falmouth Academy offers five sports: Soccer and cross country in the fall, Basketball in the winter, and Lacrosse and tennis in the spring. 

After 25 years in the New England Preparatory School Athletic Council small divisions, Falmouth Academy jointed the Massachusetts Interscholastic Athletic Association and the Cape & Islands League in 2014. The girls basketball and girls lacrosse teams won the league championships in 2014, 2015 2016, 2017, and 2018.  The boys lacrosse team were the 2021 league champions.

Arts 
Falmouth Academy offers a variety of arts, including visual arts, music, and drama.

Visual arts and music are offered as electives, with introductory and advanced drawing, painting, and ceramics classes, and six different ensembles. An afterschool rock band is an additional extra-curricular activity that students may partake in. There are public concerts held at the end of the fall, winter, and spring trimesters.

Although there are introductory and advanced drama electives during the school day, most of Falmouth Academy's drama program comes in the form of after-school plays. There are three plays a year, held at the end of each trimester. Students may either join the cast of the play or be part of the tech and stage crew in Falmouth Academy's stagecraft program. Students that are a part of one of these productions will typically rehearse and work after school hours. The play held at the end of the winter trimester is typically a middle school play that only accepts cast members in the 9th grade and below.

Student body 
Students come from a broad area of southeastern Massachusetts that is roughly bordered by Martha’s Vineyard, Mattapoisett, Middleboro, Duxbury, and Brewster. The school has also hosted more than 60 international students from about 24 countries.

References

External links 
 Falmouth Academy

1977 establishments in Massachusetts
Educational institutions established in 1977
Falmouth, Massachusetts
Private high schools in Massachusetts
Private middle schools in Massachusetts
Private preparatory schools in Massachusetts
Schools in Barnstable County, Massachusetts